The 1972 United States Senate election in Rhode Island took place on November 7, 1972. Incumbent Democratic U.S. Senator Claiborne Pell successfully sought re-election, defeating Republican John Chafee in the closest race of Pell's Senate career. Chafee was elected to Rhode Island's other Senate seat in 1976, and was colleagues with Pell until the latter's retirement in 1996.

Democratic primary

Candidates 
Claiborne Pell, incumbent U.S. Senator

Republican primary

Candidates 
John Chafee, former Governor of Rhode Island and former United States Secretary of the Navy

General election

Results

References

External links

Rhode Island
1972
1972 Rhode Island elections